HMS Southampton was the name ship of the 32-gun  fifth-rate frigates of the Royal Navy. She was launched in 1757 and served for more than half a century until wrecked in 1812.

Career

In 1772, Southampton – at the time commanded by the capable John MacBride, destined for a distinguished naval career – was sent to Elsinore, Denmark, to take on board and convey to exile in Germany the British Princess Caroline Matilda, George III's sister, who had been deposed from her position as Queen of Denmark due to her affair with the social reformer Johan Struensee.

On 3 August 1780, Southampton captured the French privateer lugger , of 12 guns and 80 men, under the command of Joseph Le Cluck. She had on board Mr. Andrew Stuart, Surgeon's Mate of HMS Speedwell, "as a ransomer." Comte de Maurepas had suffered shot holes between wind and water and sank shortly thereafter.

Southampton took part in the action of 9 August 1780, when a convoy she was escorting fell prey to a Franco-Spanish squadron. 55 merchantmen were captured, but she managed to escape.

On 10 June 1796, Southampton captured the French corvette  at Hyères Roads, by boarding. Utile was armed with twenty-four 6-pounder guns and was under the protection of a battery. She had a crew of 136 men under the command of Citizen François Veza. The French put up a resistance during which they suffered eight killed, including Veza, and 17 wounded; Southampton had one man killed. The Royal Navy took her into service as HMS Utile.

On 2 December 1796 Southampton encountered the Spanish naval brig El Corso off Monaco as El Corso was on her way from Genoa to Barcelona. Southampton captured El Corso by boarding. She was armed with eighteen 6-pounder guns and had a crew of 136 men under the command of Don Antonio Oacaro. The Royal Navy took the brig into service as HMS Corso.

In September 1789 Richard Goodwin Keats was appointed her captain. She was engaged on two cruises of observation in the chops of the Channel and a voyage to Gibraltar conveying Prince Edward to his new command.  Southampton was readied as part of lord howe's fleet to respond to the Nootka sound incident, but was not required to put to sea. Keats had written to the Admiralty concerned at the state of his new command, which had not been in the docks for three years, during which she had grounded several times, and in 1790 she was paid off.

Lloyd's List reported that Southampton and the sloop-of-war  had run aground and lost their masts on the coast of Mississippi during a great hurricane on 19 and 20 August 1812, but that the crews were saved. Both vessels were refloated, repaired, and returned to service.  Brazen arrived at New Providence; Southampton arrived at Jamaica on 6 October. Although neither vessel was lost in the hurricane, Southampton was lost about a month later when she hit an uncharted rock.

On 22 November, Southampton, under the command of Captain James Lucas Yeo, captured the American brig . Vixen was armed with twelve 18-pounder carronades and two 9-pounder bow chasers, and had a crew of 130 men under the command of Captain George Reed. She had been out five weeks but had not captured anything.

Fate 
A strong westerly current wrecked Southampton and Vixen on an uncharted submerged reef off Conception Island in the Crooked Island Passage of the Bahamas on 27 November. There were no deaths.

Footnotes
Notes

Citations

References
 Demerliac, Alain (1996) La Marine De Louis XVI: Nomenclature Des Navires Français De 1774 À 1792. (Nice: Éditions OMEGA). 
 Gardiner, Robert (1992) The First Frigates. (London: Conway Maritime Press). .
 Gossett, William Patrick (1986) The lost ships of the Royal Navy, 1793–1900. (London: Mansell). 
 
 
 
 Lyon, David (1993) The Sailing Navy List. (London: Conway Maritime Press). .
 Winfield, Rif (2007) British Warships in the Age of Sail, 1714 to 1792. (London: Seaforth Publishing). .

External links
 

 

1757 ships
Ships built on the River Thames
Fifth-rate frigates of the Royal Navy
Maritime incidents in 1812
War of 1812 ships of the United Kingdom